Minnow Branch is a stream in Marion County in the U.S. state of Missouri. It is a tributary of Bear Creek.

Minnows in the creek caused the name to be selected.

See also
List of rivers of Missouri

References

Rivers of Marion County, Missouri
Rivers of Missouri